Hemithea aquamarina is a moth of the family Geometridae first described by George Hampson in 1895. It is found in the north-eastern parts of the Himalayas, Taiwan and Borneo.

Adults have bluish green, rather translucent wings with white and darker green fasciae and green fringes.

References

Moths described in 1895
Hemitheini